The Verbandsliga is usually a tier-six football league in the German football league system, covering the area of a Bundesland or a regional part of such Bundesland.

As the German football league system below the tier-four Regionalliga is organised individually by the 21 state member associations of the nationwide governing body German Football Association (Deutscher Fußball-Bund), the league structure varies somewhat from state to state. Therefore the Verbandsliga does not exist in every Bundesland. In North Rhine-Westphalia (Middle Rhine and Lower Rhine), Saxony, Thuringia, Hamburg, Lower Saxony, Bremen, and Bavaria, the corresponding sixth tier is called the Landesliga, whereas the Landesliga is only a tier-seven league in most of the other German states. North Rhine-Westphalia, Rhineland-Palatinate, and Baden-Württemberg are divided into two or three state member associations, each running their own league system. Additionally, in some regions or states, as there are Hesse, Westphalia, and Schleswig-Holstein the Verbandsliga is operated in two or more groups running in parallel.

In recent years, a number of leagues have dropped the Verband out of their league name, preferring to call themselves just by the region or Bundesland they are from. The Verbandsliga Berlin became the Berlin-Liga, the Verbandsliga Brandenburg became the Brandenburg-Liga, the Verbandsliga Westfalen became the Westfalenliga and the Verbandsliga Rheinland became the Rheinlandliga. The Verbandsliga Mittelrhein became the Mittelrheinliga and the Verbandsliga Niederrhein became the Niederrheinliga, with both leagues elevated to Oberliga status in 2012.

Verbandsligas
The Verbandsligas:

 Some of the Verbandsligen have existed prior to their mentioned formation date under a different name. Dates given are when the leagues changed to the name Verbandsliga.
1 The Verbandsliga Saarland is only a tier-seven league from 2009 onwards, after the Saarlandliga was introduced as the new tier-six league.
2 The Westfalenliga is operated in two parallel groups with teams probably re-allocated according to geographical needs every new season. The four groups of Landesliga below the can feed either Westfalenliga group according to geographical needs.
3 The Verbandsliga Schleswig-Holstein is a tier-seven league from 2017 onwards with the introduction of the Landesliga Schleswig-Holstein as the new tier-six league.

Clubs in the Verbandsligen

References

External links 
 The German Football State Associations at DFB.de

 
6
Germany